João Victor Andrade Caetano (born 24 June 1999), commonly known as Caetano, is a Brazilian professional footballer who plays as a central defender for Corinthians.

References

External links

Living people
1999 births
Association football defenders
Campeonato Brasileiro Série A players
Campeonato Brasileiro Série B players
CR Vasco da Gama players
Botafogo de Futebol e Regatas players
Sport Club Corinthians Paulista players
Oeste Futebol Clube players
Coritiba Foot Ball Club players
Associação Desportiva São Caetano players
Clube de Regatas Brasil players
Goiás Esporte Clube players
Footballers from Rio de Janeiro (city)
Brazilian footballers